There are three international schools in Kisumu, Kenya:

 Western International School of Kenya (WISK) – The school provides international education to students between 2 and 19 years of age. From kindergarten to year 13, students are taught using student-centred methods. Emphasis is on the development of the whole person. Students in years 10 and 11 are prepared for the International General Certificate of Secondary Education (IGCSE) examination and those in years 12 and 13 are prepared for the Cambridge A level examination.
 Braeburn Kisumu International School – The school is private and caters primarily to the children of diplomats and expatriate staff in Kenya.
 White Oaks School - The school is a model talent and innovation learning center for pupils aged 3 to 19. It prepares students for the IGCSE exams and nurtures musical, sporting and other talents.

See also

 Education in Kenya
 List of international schools
 List of schools in Kenya

References

Education in Nyanza Province
+Kisumu
Kisumu